Dilanchi may refer to:
 Dilanchi-ye Arkhi-ye Pain, East Azerbaijan Province
 Dilanchi-ye Olya, Kermanshah Province
 Dilanchi-ye Sofla, Kermanshah Province